Oka Ivanovich Gorodovikov (– 26 February 1960) was a Soviet Red Army cavalry general.

Biography 
During July and August 1920, he commanded the 2nd Cavalry Army. He served as Inspector-General of Cavalry from 1938 to 1941, and as Deputy Commander of Cavalry from 1943 until his retirement in 1947. The town of Gorodovikovsk in his native Kalmykia was named after him in 1971.

References

External links

1879 births
1960 deaths
Burials at Novodevichy Cemetery
People from Proletarsky District, Rostov Oblast
People from Don Host Oblast
Kalmyk people
Communist Party of the Soviet Union members
First convocation members of the Soviet of Nationalities
Uzbek Soviet Socialist Republic people
Soviet colonel generals
Russian military personnel of World War I
Soviet military personnel of World War II
Heroes of the Soviet Union
Recipients of the Order of the Red Banner
Recipients of the Order of Lenin